Kjæsvannet ( or ) is a lake on the border of the municipalities of Porsanger and Lebesby in Troms og Finnmark county, Norway. The  lake is located on the Sværholt Peninsula, about half-way between the villages of Veidnes and Brenna.

See also
List of lakes in Norway

References

Lebesby
Porsanger
Lakes of Troms og Finnmark